Gallatin County, is a county located in the northern part of the U.S. state of Kentucky. Its county seat is Warsaw. The county was founded in 1798 and named for Albert Gallatin, the Secretary of the Treasury under President Thomas Jefferson. Gallatin County is included in the Cincinnati-Middletown, OH-KY-IN Metropolitan Statistical Area. It is located along the Ohio River across from Indiana.

History
The county was formed on December 14, 1798. Gallatin was the 31st Kentucky county to be established. It was derived from parts of Franklin and Shelby counties. Later, parts of the county were pared off to create three additional counties: Owen in 1819, Trimble in 1836, and Carroll in 1838. Today Gallatin is one tenth of its original size. Its northern border is the Ohio River.

The population of Gallatin County in 1800 was 1,291, according to the Second Census of Kentucky, composed of 960 whites, 329 slaves, and 2 "freemen of color".

During the Civil War, several skirmishes occurred in the county and the Union Army arrested a number of men for treason for supporting the Confederates.

The 1866 Gallatin County Race Riot happened just after the Civil War, when bands of lawless Ku Klux Klansmen terrorized parts of the Bluegrass State. "A band of five hundred whites in Gallatin County... forced hundreds of blacks to flee across the Ohio River."

On December 4, 1868, two passenger steamers, the America and the United States, collided on the Ohio River near Warsaw. The United States carried a cargo of kerosene barrels which caught fire. The flames soon spread to the America, and many passengers perished by burning or drowning. The combined death toll was 162, making it one of the most deadly steamboat accidents in American history.

The Lynchings of the Frenches of Warsaw were conducted by a white mob on May 3, 1876. It was unusual as Benjamin and Mollie French were killed for the murder of Lake Jones, another, older African-American man. They were hanged by local masked KKK members.

As the 20th century progressed, commercial river trade began to decline, and the steamboat era ended, as faster means of transportation became available. Rail lines expanded, automobiles and trucks became reliable, and aircraft soon arrived on the scene. In the postwar period after World War II, numerous major highways were constructed, leading to greater auto travel and commuting. Gallatin County is traversed by I-71, U.S. 42, and U.S. 127. By the 1980s, more than 50 percent of the population was employed outside the county.

Construction on the Markland Locks and Dam began in 1956 and was completed in 1964. In 1967 a hydroelectric power plant was built at the dam, which provided jobs.

Marco Allen Chapman was executed in 2008 for multiple murders he committed on August 23, 2002, in Warsaw, Kentucky. He murdered two children, Chelbi Sharon, 7, and Cody Sharon, 6, by slitting their throats. He raped and stabbed their mother, Carolyn Marksberry, more than 15 times. A third child, daughter 10-year-old Courtney Sharon, played dead after being stabbed and then escaped. Thirty-seven-year-old Chapman was executed on November 21, 2008, by lethal injection at the Kentucky State Penitentiary in Eddyville, Kentucky. He was the last person executed by the Commonwealth.

Geography
It is the second smallest county by area in Kentucky.

Adjacent counties
 Switzerland County, Indiana (north)
 Boone County  (northeast)
 Grant County  (southeast)
 Owen County  (south)
 Carroll County  (west)

Demographics

As of the 2010 United States Census, there were 8,589 people living in the county. 94.7% were White, 1.3% Black or African American, 0.2% Asian, 0.1% Native American, 1.6% of some other race and 2.0% of two or more races. 4.3% were Hispanic or Latino (of any race). 22.6% were of German, 21.4% American, 13.8% Irish and 6.5% English ancestry.

As of the census of 2000, there were 7,870 people, 2,902 households, and 2,135 families living in the county. The racial makeup of the county was 96.72% White, 1.59% Black or African American, 0.18% Native American, 0.22% Asian, 0.25% from other races, and 1.04% from two or more races.  1.04% of the population were Hispanic or Latino of any race.

There were 2,902 households, out of which 37.00% had children under the age of 18 living with them, 58.00% were married couples living together, 10.70% had a female householder with no husband present, and 26.40% were non-families. 22.00% of all households were made up of individuals, and 8.20% had someone living alone who was 65 years of age or older. The average household size was 2.68 and the average family size was 3.11.

In the county, the population was spread out, with 28.60% under the age of 18, 7.70% from 18 to 24, 31.00% from 25 to 44, 22.50% from 45 to 64, and 10.30% who were 65 years of age or older. The median age was 35 years. For every 100 females there were 98.90 males. For every 100 females age 18 and over, there were 96.00 males.

The median income for a household in the county was $36,422, and the median income for a family was $41,136. Males had a median income of $32,081 versus $21,803 for females. The per capita income for the county was $16,416. About 11.60% of families and 13.40% of the population were below the poverty line, including 16.60% of those under age 18 and 16.40% of those age 65 or over.

Politics
Gallatin County used to be Democratic. In 1984, it was tied between Walter Mondale and Ronald Reagan, even as Reagan won Kentucky in a landslide (see blue tab below). However, more recently it has turned more Republican, giving 73% of the vote to Donald Trump (even as Trump lost the popular vote nationally) in 2016 (see blue tab below).

Communities
 Glencoe
 Sparta
 Warsaw (county seat)

Infrastructure

Transportation
Interstate 71 runs through Gallatin County, with three exits around Sparta and Glencoe. Public transportation is provided by Senior Services of Northern Kentucky with demand-response service.

Notable residents

 Samuel Brenton (November 22, 1810 – March 29, 1857) a US Representative from Indiana; born in Gallatin County, Kentucky.

See also

 National Register of Historic Places listings in Gallatin County, Kentucky

References

External links
 Northern Kentucky Views

 
Kentucky counties
Kentucky counties on the Ohio River
1798 establishments in Kentucky
Populated places established in 1798